The Union Dutchmen ice hockey team is a National Collegiate Athletic Association (NCAA) Division I men's college ice hockey program that represents Union College. The Dutchmen are a member of ECAC Hockey. They play at the Frank L. Messa Rink at Achilles Center in Schenectady, New York.  The Dutchmen won the 2014 NCAA Division I Men's Ice Hockey Tournament by defeating the Minnesota Golden Gophers 7-4.

Program history
The hockey team was founded in 1904 making it the 7th oldest college program playing in NCAA Division I  and provides the school with a long and colorful history in the sport.  Men at Union have played hockey in four distinct periods: club hockey from 1904-1911, varsity hockey from 1919-1949 (from 1943-1948 there was a hiatus from play due to WW II), NCAA Division III hockey from 1975-1990 and NCAA Division I hockey from 1991–present.

Early history 1904–1911
Union's first game, played on February 3, 1904, was a victory over the Union Classical Institute.  Three other games were played that inaugural season including a 1-4 loss to rival Rensselaer.  Lacking a rink of its own during that inaugural season, all games were played on the opponent's home ice.  The first attempt at creating an on-campus outdoor rink was made by students in 1905 when a plow and scaper was hired to form a level area with earthen banks near what is now Memorial Chapel. The club team's record in known games during those early years was 6-7-1.  No collegiate games were played in the 1910 or 1911 seasons because Union's players couldn't afford the costs of travel and opponent game guarantee fees. The club team subsequently disbanded bringing a close to the earliest era of hockey at Union.

Varsity era 1919–1949

Division III era 1975–1990

Division I era 1991–present

Season-by-season results
Source:

Championships

NCAA National Championships

ECAC Hockey Tournament Championships (Whitelaw Cups)

Runners-up in 2010

ECAC Hockey Regular Season Championships (Cleary Cups)

† Shared with Harvard

Players

Current roster
As of August 4, 2022.

|}

Awards & honors
As of April 2017

Hobey Baker Memorial Award
Mike Vecchione - Hat Trick Finalist, F: 2017
Troy Grosenick - Top 10 Finalist, G: 2012
Shayne Gostisbehere - Top 10 Finalist, D: 2014
Daniel Ciampini - Top 10 Finalist, F: 2015
Spencer Foo - Top 10 Finalist, F: 2017

Spencer Penrose Award - AHCA Coach of the Year
Nate Leaman: 2011
Rick Bennett: 2014

USCHO Coach of the Year
Rick Bennett: 2014

College Hockey News Coach of the Year
Rick Bennett: 2014

NCAA Frozen Four Most Outstanding Player
Shayne Gostisbehere, D: 2014

NCAA Frozen Four All-Tournament Team
Matt Bodie, D: 2014
Daniel Ciampini, F: 2014
Shayne Gostisbehere, D: 2014
Colin Stevens, G: 2014

NCAA East Regional Most Outstanding Player
Max Novak, F: 2014
Jeremy Welsh, F: 2014

Tim Taylor Award - ECAC Hockey Coach of the Year
Bruce Delventhal: 1994
Stan Moore: 1997
Nate Leaman: 2010, 2011
Rick Bennett: 2012, 2017

ECAC Hockey Player of the Year
Shayne Gostisbehere, D: 2013 (co-recipient)
Mike Vecchione, F: 2017

Ken Dryden Award - ECAC Hockey Goaltender of the Year
Trevor Koenig, G: 1997
Keith Kinkaid, G: 2011
Troy Grosenick, G: 2012
Colin Stevens, G: 2014

ECAC Hockey Best Defensive Defenseman
Andrew Will, D: 1997 (co-recipient)
Brock Matheson, D: 2011
Shayne Gostisbehere, D: 2014

ECAC Hockey Best Defensive Forward
Adam Presizniuk, F: 2011
Kelly Zajac, F: 2012

ECAC Hockey Student Athlete of the Year
Oliver Bouchard: 2007
Matt Cook: 2009
Stephane Boileau: 2011
Josh Kosack: 2022

ECAC Hockey Tournament Most Outstanding Player
Jeremy Welsh, F: 2012
Troy Grosenick, G: 2013
Daniel Carr, F: 2014

ECAC Hockey All-Tournament Team
Mike Schreiber, D: 2010
Daniel Carr, F: 2012, 2013, 2014
Shayne Gostisbehere, D: 2012
Troy Grosenick, G: 2012, 2013
Jeremy Welsh, F: 2012
 Greg Coburn, D: 2013
Max Novak, F: 2013
Matt Bodie, D: 2014
Shayne Gostisbehere, D: 2014
Colin Stevens, G: 2014
Mike Vecchione, F: 2014

AHCA First Team All-Americans (DI) - East
1995-96: Trevor Koenig, G
2010-11: Keith Kinkaid, G
2011-12: Troy Grosenick, G
2013-14: Matt Bodie, D; Shayne Gostisbehere, D
2014-15: Daniel Ciampini, F
2016-17: Mike Vecchione, F; Spencer Foo, F

AHCA Second Team All-Americans (DI) - East
2011-12: Matt Bodie, D; Jeremy Welsh, F
2012-13: Shayne Gostisbehere, D
2013-14: Daniel Carr, F; Colin Stevens, G

AHCA Second Team All-Americans (DIII) - East
1985-86: Wayne McDougall, G
1999-89: Ron Kinghorn, G
1989-90: Terry Campbell, F

Academic All-American Second Team
2009-10: Stephane Boileau
2013-14: Cole Ikkala

Academic All-American Third Team
2011-12: Troy Grosenick
2012-13: Troy Grosenick
2013-14: Matt Bodie
2016-17: Mike Vecchione

Union College Athletics Hall of Fame
Wayne McDougall, G: 2005
Steve Baker, G: 2007
Gil Egan, F: 2008
Craig Ferrero, F: 2009
Tod Fobare, F: 2010
Terry Campbell, F: 2015
Charlie Morrison, Head Coach: 2015

Historic records

Records vs. Current ECAC Hockey Teams 
As of the completion of the 2018–19 season

In-season tournaments
As of April 2017

Program records

Individual – career
Most goals in a career: Gil Egan, 83, (1981–85)
Most points in a career: Mike Vecchione, 176, (2013–17)
Most assists in a career: Terry Campbell, 119, (1987–91)
Most power play goals in a career: Daniel Carr, 34, (2010–14)
Most game winning goals in a career: Wayne Simpson, 16, (2009–13)
Most shots in a career: Wayne Simpson, 447, (2009–13)
Most wins in a career: Kris Mayotte, 46, (2002–06)
Best goals-against-average in a career: Troy Grosenick, 1.89, (2010–13)
Most saves in a career: Brandon Snee, 3,085, (1998–02)
Best save percentage in a career: Troy Grosenick, .930, (2010–13)

Individual – season
Most goals in a season: Mike Vecchione, 29, (2016–17)
Most points in a season: Mike Vecchione, 63, (2016–17)
Most assists in a season: Spencer Foo, 36, (2016–17)
Most power play goals in a season: Daniel Carr, 12, (2010–11)
Most game winning goals in a season: Max Novak, 8, (2013–14)
Most shots in a season: Shayne Gostisbehere, 159, (2013–14)
Most wins in a season: Colin Stevens, 28, (2013–14)
Best goals-against-average in a season: Troy Grosenick, 1.65, (2011–12)
Most saves in a career: Kris Mayotte, 987, (2005–06)
Best save percentage in a career: Troy Grosenick, .936, (2011–12)

Team – game
Most goals in a game: 11 vs. Clarkson (2/5/10)
Most goals allowed in a game: 10 vs. Penn State (3/25/17)
Most goals combined in a game: 15 vs. Clarkson (11/13/93) & Merrimack (11/1/91)
Most shots taken in a game: 75 vs. Quinnipiac (3/12/10)
Most shots allowed in a game: 63 vs. Bemidji State (10/26/02)
Fewest shots taken in a game: 13 (5x) last time vs. Cornell (11/18/05)
Fewest shots allowed in a game: 9 vs. Cornell (2/11/11)
Most penalties in a game: 27 vs. Cornell (12/4/98)
Most penalty minutes in a game: 116 vs. Cornell (12/4/98)
Longest game: 150:22 in 5 OTs lasting 5 hrs., 56 minutes vs. Quinnipiac (3/12/10)

Team – season
Most wins in a season: 32 (2013–14)
Most conference wins in a season: 18 (2013–14) ECAC Hockey
Most consecutive wins in a season: 12 (2013–14)
Longest unbeaten streak in a season: 17 (2013–14)

Head coaches

All-time coaching records
As of completion of the 2022–23 season

† Bob Driscoll coached the final 13 games of the 1977–78 season after Ned Harkness resigned.
‡ Rick Bennett was suspended on January 19, 2022 and John Ronan coached the final 17 games of the season.

Dutchmen in the NHL
As of July 1, 2022.

Source:

See also
Union Dutchwomen ice hockey
Union Dutchmen and Dutchwomen

References

External links

 
Ice hockey teams in New York (state)